Crosby is a city and the county seat of Divide County, North Dakota, United States.  The population was 1,065 at the 2020 census.

History
Crosby was founded in 1904 at the end of a Great Northern Railway branch line that began in Berthold. The name comes from S.A. Crosby, a businessman from Portal involved in establishing the city.

Geography
Crosby is located at  (48.912488, −103.294707).

Demographics

2010 census
As of the census of 2010, there were 1,070 people, 513 households, and 281 families living in the city. The racial makeup of the city was 98.1% White, 0.3% African American, 0.5% Native American, 0.3% Asian, 0.1% from other races, and 0.7% from two or more races. Hispanic or Latino of any race were 1.9% of the population.

There were 513 households, of which 20.9% had children under the age of 18 living with them, 44.2% were married couples living together, 6.4% had a female householder with no husband present, 4.1% had a male householder with no wife present, and 45.2% were non-families. 40.5% of all households were made up of individuals, and 18.3% had someone living alone who was 65 years of age or older. The average household size was 1.98 and the average family size was 2.64.

The median age in the city was 50.4 years. 17.4% of residents were under the age of 18; 5.3% were between the ages of 18 and 24; 18.8% were from 25 to 44; 29.9% were from 45 to 64; and 28.7% were 65 years of age or older. The gender makeup of the city was 49.0% male and 51.0% female.

2000 census
As of the census of 2000, there were 1,089 people, 489 households, and 290 families living in the city. The population density was 807.6 people per square mile (311.5/km). There were 637 housing units at an average density of 472.4 per square mile (182.2/km). The racial makeup of the city was 98.26% White, 0.28% Native American, 1.01% Asian, 0.18% from other races, and 0.28% from two or more races. Hispanic or Latino of any race were 0.83% of the population.

There were 489 households, out of which 22.1% had children under the age of 18 living with them, 50.1% were married couples living together, 5.9% had a female householder with no husband present, and 40.5% were non-families. 38.0% of all households were made up of individuals, and 24.5% had someone living alone who was 65 years of age or older. The average household size was 2.09 and the average family size was 2.77.

In the city, the population was spread out, with 19.5% under the age of 18, 4.6% from 18 to 24, 18.7% from 25 to 44, 23.3% from 45 to 64, and 33.9% who were 65 years of age or older. The median age was 50 years. For every 100 females, there were 88.1 males. For every 100 females age 18 and over, there were 79.3 males.

The median income for a household in the city was $26,382, and the median income for a family was $39,643. Males had a median income of $27,500 versus $15,882 for females. The per capita income for the city was $15,922. About 8.5% of families and 13.6% of the population were below the poverty line, including 18.4% of those under age 18 and 15.4% of those age 65 or over.

Notable people

 G. Raymond Carlson, General Superintendent of Assemblies of God
 Martin Olav Sabo, U.S. Congressman from Minnesota

Climate

According to the Köppen Climate Classification system, Crosby has a warm-summer humid continental climate, abbreviated "Dfb " on climate maps.
Based on climate data in the years 1991–2020, the average date for the first autumn frost is September 23 while the last apring frost is usually around May 14, giving Crosby, North Dakota an average growing season of 132 days.

References

External links

 City of Crosby
 The Journal newspaper website
 "Not Far From Forsaken" Article by Richard Rubin, The New York Times magazine, April 9, 2006.
 Crosby diamond jubilee, 1904–1979 :pioneers in '04 now thriving more, 75 years of progress, Crosby, North Dakota, July 17–18, 1979 from the Digital Horizons website

Cities in North Dakota
Cities in Divide County, North Dakota
County seats in North Dakota
Populated places established in 1904
1904 establishments in North Dakota